Glenys Elizabeth Kinnock, Baroness Kinnock of Holyhead  (née Parry; born 7 July 1944), is a British politician and former teacher who served as Minister of State for Europe from June to October 2009 and Minister of State for Africa and the United Nations from 2009 to 2010. A member of the Labour Party, she was previously a Member of the European Parliament (MEP) for Wales, formerly South Wales East, from 1994 to 2009.

Early life
Glenys Elizabeth Parry was born in Roade, Northamptonshire, and educated at Holyhead High School, Anglesey. She graduated in 1965 from University College, Cardiff in education and history. She met her future husband Neil Kinnock at university and married him in 1967. She worked as a teacher in secondary, primary, infant and nursery schools, including the Wykeham Primary School, Neasden, London, when she was a member of the National Union of Teachers (NUT).

European Parliament
Kinnock represented Wales in the European Parliament from 1994 until 2009, where she was a member of the Party of European Socialists (PES) political group. She was a Member of the European Parliament's Development and Co-operation Committee and a substitute member of the Committee on Citizens' Freedoms and Rights, Justice and Home Affairs. She was a co-president of the African, Caribbean and Pacific-EU Joint Parliamentary Assembly from 2002 to 2009, and Labour spokesperson on International Development in the European Parliament.

In November 2006, Glenys Kinnock was criticised in the press for "taking a junket" to Barbados to discuss world poverty issues. She was co-presiding over the 12th ACP-EU Joint Parliamentary Assembly, which was invited by the Barbados government to discuss international aid and development.

On 18 January 2009, Kinnock revealed on the BBC's The Andrew Marr Show that she and Neil Kinnock had received a personal invitation from Joe Biden to attend Barack Obama's presidential inauguration on 20 January 2009 at the United States Capitol in Washington, D.C.

In 2004, Glenys Kinnock was caught up in an expenses scandal. Fellow MEP Hans-Peter Martin claimed to have caught 194 colleagues receiving the European Parliament's attendance allowance. Kinnock was among those MEPs whom Martin found and filmed leaving the building just moments after they had signed in for the day to qualify for their £175-a-day allowance, in addition to their £70,000 salaries as MEPs.

United Kingdom Parliament
In the 2009 cabinet reshuffle, Kinnock was appointed Minister for Europe following the resignation of Caroline Flint. To enable her to join the government, she was awarded a life peerage and became Baroness Kinnock of Holyhead, of Holyhead in the County of Ynys Môn, on 30 June 2009. She was introduced to the House of Lords on the same day.

She is a member of Labour Friends of Israel.

In September 2009, The Daily Telegraph listed Baroness Kinnock as the UK's 38th 'Most influential Left-winger', stating: "People working closely with the new minister have asked why on earth better use had not been made of her sooner. She has impressed civil servants and, more importantly, made a good impression on visits and in meetings abroad."

In 2009, while she was Minister for Europe, the status of the Welsh language was elevated to make it equal with several other European minority languages, such as Catalan. The cost of translation services was to be met by the Welsh Assembly and the Welsh Language Board. Kinnock commented "This demonstrates a clear commitment by the EU to promote its unique and diverse cultural heritage."

From 12 October 2009 to 11 May 2010 Glenys Kinnock served as Minister of State with responsibility for Africa, the Caribbean, Central America and the UN, filling a post left vacant after the resignation of Lord Malloch-Brown.

From 2010 to 2013, she was an Opposition spokesperson for the Department of International Development in the House of Lords.

She retired from the House of Lords on 9 April 2021.

Patron and honours
Baroness Kinnock is a Council Member of the European Council on Foreign Relations.

She is a patron, president or board member of a number of charitable organisations, including Womankind Worldwide, Saferworld, Drop the Debt, EdUKaid, Parliamentarians for Global Action, The Burma Campaign UK, International AIDS Vaccine Initiative, Voluntary Service Overseas, Freedom from Torture, and Humanists UK, and is an honorary associate of the National Secular Society. She is also Patron to Snap Cymru, a Welsh children's charity. Council member of Overseas Development Institute Member of Advisory Board of Global Witness. Also patron to Life for African Mothers, a maternal health charity based in Cardiff and working in sub Saharan Africa

She founded One World Action (formerly The Bernt Carlsson Trust) on 21 December 1989, exactly one year after UN Commissioner for Namibia, Bernt Carlsson, was killed in the Pan Am Flight 103 crash. In December 2007, a United Nations inquiry was called into Bernt Carlsson's death.

She is a Fellow of the Royal Society of Arts, an honorary Fellow of the University of Wales, Newport, and the University of Wales, Bangor. She holds honorary Doctorates from Thames Valley University, Brunel University and Kingston University.

Personal life 
She is the wife of Neil Kinnock, who was leader of the Labour Party from 1983 to 1992. When her husband received a life peerage in 2005, she became entitled to the style "Lady Kinnock", which she chose not to use. She was awarded a life peerage when she joined the government in 2009. She and her husband are one of the few couples each to hold life peerages in their own right.

Kinnock grew up speaking Welsh, but did not use the language in conversation with her husband or her son, Stephen Kinnock. Her son is married to the former Danish prime minister Helle Thorning-Schmidt and through him she has two grandchildren. Through her daughter Rachel she has two granddaughters and a grandson. She is a member of the GMB trade union and the Co-operative Party.

In 2017, she was diagnosed with Alzheimer’s disease.

Publications
Voices for One World, 1987
Eritrea – images of war and peace, 1988
Namibia – birth of a nation, 1991
By Faith and Daring, 1993
Zimbabwe on the brink, 2002

See also
Sustrans

References

External links
Profile at European Parliament website
Speeches made in the European Parliament
Mrs Kinnock, co-president of the ACP EU Joint Parliamentary Assembly

|-

|-

1944 births
Living people
Alumni of Cardiff University
British baronesses
British secularists
Life peeresses created by Elizabeth II
Glenys
Labour Party (UK) life peers
People with Alzheimer's disease
Welsh Labour MEPs
MEPs for Wales 1994–1999
MEPs for Wales 1999–2004
MEPs for Wales 2004–2009
20th-century women MEPs for Wales
21st-century women MEPs for Wales
People educated at Holyhead High School
People from Holyhead
Welsh socialists
Welsh humanists
People from West Northamptonshire District
Schoolteachers from Northamptonshire
Welsh-speaking politicians
Labour Friends of Israel
Spouses of life peers
21st-century British women writers
20th-century British women writers